Nemrem, known as Zengage in North America and Somnium in Japan, is a puzzle video game developed by Skip Ltd. and published by Nintendo for the Nintendo DSi's DSiWare digital distribution service.

Gameplay
The game involves players sliding colored tiles on a game board in order to match the positions of colored balls resting on the same board.

Some puzzles in higher-level stages may feature obstacles that could send some colored balls bouncing elsewhere or get stuck, etc.

Development
Nemrem was announced for the DSiWare service on January 28, 2009, and released two days later alongside Art Style: Picopict, another title in the Art Style series.

Reception

Nemrem received mixed reviews from critics upon release. On Metacritic, the game holds a score of 65/100 based on 5 reviews, indicating "mixed or average reviews". JC Fletcher of Joystiq felt that being released alongside Picopict caused it to be overlooked when it was released in Japan. In their group review of DSiWare games, GameSpy writers Brian Altano and Brian Miggels gave it a rating of 'worthless', suggesting that the name Zengage feels "pompous" due to it lacking engaging gameplay. They also criticized it for not having a memorable style or "Zen-like qualities". They suggested that it was boring and a waste of money. Jon Jordan of Pocket Gamer felt it was "nothing to get excited about", and that a person's enjoyment of the game is more about whether they like cerebral puzzles or not. They also praised the presentation as "pleasant" despite also being "fairly muted". Craig Harris of IGN praised it for enhancing the concept of slide puzzles, a genre which he criticized for being over-saturated on DSiWare due to the ease of making them. He also noted it as one of the most challenging DSiWare games, praising its soundtrack as "brilliantly relaxing" and commented that the relaxing music was meant to keep players caLm during the game's most difficult puzzles. He did not enjoy it much, but felt that people who like difficult games would. On the other hand, Neil Ronaghan of Nintendo World Report praised it for its depth, calling its aesthetic "cool and somewhat creepy".

References

External links
Official website

2009 video games
DSiWare games
Nintendo DS-only games
Nintendo DS games
Puzzle video games
Skip Ltd. games
Video games developed in Japan

Nintendo games
Single-player video games